Raúl Fernando Saavedra (born 8 March 1978, in San Miguel de Tucumán) is an Argentine former football defender.

Career

Saavedra started his playing career in 2000 in the Argentine 2nd division with Atlético Tucumán. Two years later he joined Quilmes and won promotion to the Argentine Primera with the club in 2003.

In 2005, he joined San Lorenzo but he returned to Quilmes after only one season. Following Quilmes' relegation the following season he joined Olimpo who were relegated the following season. In 2008, he joined newly promoted San Martín de Tucumán. On 23 November 2008 he scored his first goal for San Martín, a long range equalizer against Boca Juniors in a 1-2 defeat. However, Saavedra suffered another top flight relegation with San Martín at the end of the 2008–09 season. Subsequently, the defender joined San Martín's town rivals Atlético Tucumán, recently promoted to the Primera División. Nonetheless, he returned to San Martín after suffering his fourth top flight relegation in a row while at Atlético.

References

External links
 Raúl Saavedra at BDFA.com.ar 
 Raúl Saavedra – Argentine Primera statistics at Fútbol XXI  
 

1978 births
Living people
Sportspeople from San Miguel de Tucumán
Argentine footballers
Association football defenders
Argentine Primera División players
Atlético Tucumán footballers
Quilmes Atlético Club footballers
San Lorenzo de Almagro footballers
Olimpo footballers
San Martín de Tucumán footballers